St James' Church is a parish church in the Church of England in Aston, Birmingham, England.

History

The church formed as a mission church from Church of SS Peter & Paul, Aston in 1891 and a new building was erected in 1906 to the designs of the architect J.A. Chatwin.

It was consecrated by Charles Gore, Bishop of Birmingham, on Saturday 2 November 1906.

The Chatwin church was demolished and a new church built in 1981 to the designs of the architect G Winteringham. This building was damaged in a fire in 2001 but was restored and reopened.

Organ

The Chatwin church of 1906 was equipped with a three manual pipe organ by Conacher of Sheffeld. A specification of the organ can be found on the National Pipe Organ Register. but is no longer present.

References

Church of England church buildings in Birmingham, West Midlands